Deymeh-ye Dagher (also Romanized as Deymeh-ye Dāgher) is a village in Buzi Rural District, in the Central District of Shadegan County, Khuzestan Province, Iran. At the 2006 census, its population was 37, in 6 families.

References 

Populated places in Shadegan County